The Mediterranean Handball Confederation, officially abbreviated as MHC, is the governing body of handball in the Mediterranean region.

History 
On 12 June  1999 in Cairo (Egypt), the Mediterranean Handball Association (MHA) has been established among the following countries: Algeria, Cyprus, Egypt, Greece, Italy, Libya, Morocco, Portugal, Syria, Tunisia, Turkey and Yugoslavia. The first president of MHA was Dr. Hassan Moustafa (Egypt).

On 22 February 2003, in Rome (Italy), the Mediterranean Handball Association decided to change the original name into Mediterranean Handball Confederation and an Executive Committee was elected Francesco Purromuto (Italy) (President), Rui Coelho (Portugal), Jaume Conejero (Spain), Jean Férignac (France), Taoufik Khouaja (Tunisia) and General Charalambos Lottas (Cyprus), having the task to perform all the necessary acts to summon the MHC Congress for the approval of the MHC Rules of procedure, for the election of the Statutory bodies.

The 1st Congress was held on 28 and 29 February 2004, in Castelo Branco (Portugal), and the following countries participate as foundation members: Albania, Cyprus, Egypt, France, Greece, Israel, Libya, Malta, Portugal, Serbia and Montenegro, Slovenia, Spain, Tunisia, Turkey. Each year, the Mediterranean Handball Confederation organises the Mediterranean Men's Handball Championship and Mediterranean Women's Handball Championship on different dates. These competitions are preferably reserved to young athletes.

From 24 to 29 February 2004, the first Mediterranean Men's Handball Championship, was conducted under the aegis of the MHC, in Castelo Branco (Portugal). From 21 to 28 June 2004, the first Mediterranean Women's Handball Championship was held in Misano Adriatico (Italy). The Mediterranean Games with handball as an event were organized for the first time in Tunis 1967 (men's tournament) and Split 1979 (women's tournament).

MHC Presidents

MHC Executive Committee
The Executive Committee is the Mediterranean Handball Confederation managing Body. It consists of the MHC President and the members elected by the MHC Ordinary Congress for a four-years mandate. The following Executive Committee has been elected, for the term of the office 2015 – 2019, during the 3rd Ordinary Congress in Rome (Italy) in September 2015.

MHC Tournaments
 Mediterranean Men's Handball Championship from 2004.
 Mediterranean Women's Handball Championship from 2004.
 Handball at the Mediterranean Games from 1967 (Men's) and 1979 (Women's).
 Beach Handball at the Mediterranean Beach Games from 2015.

Women’s Mediterranean Handball Championships 

From 2004 (2005 and 2014 was not held):

Men’s Mediterranean Handball Championships 

From 2004:

Current title holders

Handball

• (Titles) (*) Record

Beach Handball

• (Titles) (*) Record

MHC Members

Full Members
 Albania
 Algeria
 Bosnia and Herzegovina
 Croatia
 Cyprus
 Egypt
 France
 Greece
 Israel
 Italy
 Lebanon
 Libya
 Malta
 Montenegro
 Morocco
 Portugal
 Serbia
 Slovenia
 Spain
 Syria
 Tunisia
 Turkey
Associated Members
 Andorra
 Monaco

Kuwait, Saudi Arabia and Bahrain competed in 2020 Men’s Mediterranean Handball Championships.

See also
 Mediterranean
 Mediterranean Sea
 Mediterranean Games
 Mediterranean Beach Games
 Balkan Handball Championships from 1979.

References

External links
Current Official website
Past Official website
Past Web Archive
History of Mediterranean Handball Confederation

1999 establishments in Egypt
Sports organizations established in 1999
Handball governing bodies
International sports organizations